The Swimming competitions at the 2015 African Games in Brazzaville was held between 6 and 11 September at the Kintele Aquatic Complex.

Events 
Similar to the program's format in 2015, swimming features a total of 42 events (20 each for men and women), including two Mixed events. The following events were contested (all pool events are long course, and distances are in metres unless stated):
Freestyle: 50, 100, 200, 400, 800, and 1,500;
Backstroke: 50, 100 and 200;
Breaststroke: 50, 100 and 200;
Butterfly: 50, 100 and 200;
Individual medley: 200 and 400;
Relays: 4×100 free, 4×200 free; 4×100 medley
Mixed events: 4 × 100 m freestyle relay and 4 × 100 m medley relay

Schedule

A = Afternoon session, N = Night session

Medal summary

Swimming medal standings upon completion of the competition are:

Results

Men's events

Women's events

Mixed events

References

External links
 Results
 https://web.archive.org/web/20150911011858/http://www.cojabrazzaville2015.com/en/calendrier-sport/?sport=16
 https://www.youtube.com/watch?v=USEE4aqy2WY

 
2015 African Games
African Games
2015